Esca is a grape disease of mature grapevines. It is a type of grapevine trunk disease.

The fungi Phaeoacremonium aleophilum, Phaeomoniella chlamydospora and Fomitiporia mediterranea are associated with the disease.

See also 
 List of grape diseases

References 

Grapevine trunk diseases